is an upcoming American drama film directed by Anna Kendrick in her directorial debut and written by Ian MacAllister McDonald. It is based on the life of serial killer Rodney Alcala, who in 1978 appeared on the television show The Dating Game in the midst of his murder spree. The film revolves around the events of the game show and stars Kendrick as contestant Cheryl Bradshaw.

Synopsis
In 1978, serial killer Rodney Alcala appeared on The Dating Game and won a date with bachelorette Cheryl Bradshaw. At the time, Alcala had murdered five women, and his strange facade during the episode later nicknamed him "The Dating Game Killer".

Cast

 Anna Kendrick as Cheryl Bradshaw
 Daniel Zovatto
 Nicolette Robinson as Laura
 Kathryn Gallagher
 Kelley Jakle
 Autumn Best
 Tony Hale

Production
In December 2017, Ian MacAllister McDonald's screenplay Rodney and Sheryl was featured on the Black List, an annual survey of the most popular scripts yet to be produced. In May 2021, Netflix announced it had bought a package around McDonald's script with Chloe Okuno on board as director and Anna Kendrick attached to star. In April 2022, with Netflix no longer attached, the film was sold at the Cannes Film Festival. It was revealed that Kendrick was now on board as director and producer as well as appearing as Cheryl Bradshaw, with the working title of the project now The Dating Game. In December 2022, a producer sued another producer for alleged fraud and breach of contract; The Dating Game was one of three films mentioned in the lawsuit.

Principal photography took place in Vancouver with Zach Kuperstein as cinematography from October to December 2022.

Release
International rights have been sold to United King Film in Israel, VVS Films in Canada, Signature Entertainment in the UK and Ireland, Telepool in Germany, Lucky Red in Italy, Sun Distribution in Latin America, Spain, and Portugal, Roadshow Films in Australia and New Zealand, Mis Label in Scandinavia, Empire Entertainment in South Africa, Aqua in Turkey, and Selim Ramia in the Middle East.

References

External links

Upcoming films
Biographical films about serial killers
Films about real serial killers
2020s English-language films
Films shot in Canada
Films shot in Vancouver
Upcoming directorial debut films